Justice Amir-ul-Mulk Mengal (born 3 April 1945 in Noshki, Chaghai District of Balochistan) is a Pakistani jurist who served as the Governor of Balochistan, in office from October 1999 till January 2003. He also served as Chief Justice of the Balochistan High Court.

He got his early education from Government High School Noshki. Later he did his M.A in Political Science from University of Karachi and L.L.B from Islamia Law College Karachi, in 1968. He joined as Advocate of Subordinate Courts in 1969. Enrolled as an Advocate of erstwhile Sindh and Balochistan High Court in 1972, and elected as General Secretary of Balochistan Bar Association the same year. He was unanimously elected as President of Balochistan Bar Association in 1979. He was appointed as Advocate General of Balochistan in 1985 and then elevated as the Judge of High Court of Balochistan in 1986. He resumed the prestigious position of Chief Justice of the High Court of Balochistan in 1996. During the course of his meritorious career in judiciary, he also remained Member, Pakistan Election Commission in 1990, Chairman Provincial Zakat Council Balochistan and Chairman Balochistan Service Tribunal.

Born on 3 April 1945 at Killi Mengal Nushki, District Chaghai; passed M.A. (Political Science) from University of Karachi; L.L.B. from Islamia Law College, Karachi in 1968; jointed as Advocate of Subordinate Courts in 1969; enrolled as an Advocate of High Court in 1972; elected as General Secretary of Balochistan Bar Association in 1972; Mengal was unanimously elected as the President of Balochistan Bar Association 1979-1983; and later appointed as Advocate-General, Balochistan on 4 April 1985; and elevated him as Additional Judge of High Court of Balochistan on 26 March 1986; confirmed as permanent Judge of the High Court of Balochistan on 26 March 1989; appointed Member, Election Commission of Pakistan on 16 August 1990 and remained as such till April, 1993; appointed as
Chairman, Provincial Zakat and Ushr Council, Balochistan on 16 February 1991 and continued as such till July, 1994;
Chairman, Balochistan Service Tribunal from 7 January 1990 till date;
appointed as Additional Labour Appellate Tribunal, Balochistan; Member Selection Board, University of Balochistan twice; nominee/Member Syndicate, University of Engineering and Technology, Khuzdar; M
ember, Board of Governors Federal Judicial Academy;
Chairman of Sub-Committee on Separation of Judiciary from Executive; remained as Member, Balochistan Subordinate Judiciary Service Tribunal; remained as Acting Chief Justice, Balochistan High Court; visited Islamic Republic of Iran with Delegation headed by Hon’ble Chief Justice of Pakistan from 7.9.1996 to 14.9.1996; appointed as Chief Justice High Court of Balochistan on 17 November 1996 and later resigned from the high court of balochistan in 1999. When Musharraf took over the country, owing to his innumerable services, he was again selected to serve as Governor of Balochistan province from 21 October 1999 to February 2003.

He also served as Chancellor of Balochistan university of Information Technology. Author of three books, two of them poetry in "brahvi", which is his mother tongue. Also wrote a book on law "Dastur-ul-Amal, Deewani Kalat."  Received Presidential award "Hilal-e-Imtiaz" on 23 March 2008 for his services in  the public sector.

References 
 http://news.bbc.co.uk/2/hi/south_asia/740132.stm

Brahui people
Pakistani lawyers
1945 births
Living people
People from Chagai District
Governors of Balochistan, Pakistan
University of Karachi alumni
Chief Justices of the Balochistan High Court